Hisarai is a genus of beetles in the family Cerambycidae. It is monotypic, being represented by the single species Hisarai seripierriae.

References

Prioninae
Monotypic Cerambycidae genera